Württemberg-Hohenzollern was a West German state created in 1945 as part of the French post-World War II occupation zone. Its capital was Tübingen. In 1952, it was merged into the newly founded state of Baden-Württemberg.

History
Württemberg-Hohenzollern should not be confused with the larger Gau ("shire") of the same name that was formed briefly during the Third Reich.

Württemberg-Hohenzollern consisted of the southern half of the former state of Württemberg and the Prussian administrative region of Hohenzollern. The northern half of Württemberg became part of the state of Württemberg-Baden under US-administration. The division between north and south was set so that the Autobahn connecting Karlsruhe and Munich (today the A8) was completely contained within the American zone.

On 18 May 1947, a new constitution was enacted and Württemberg-Baden's first parliament was elected. With the formation of West Germany on 23 May 1949, Württemberg-Baden joined the federal republic.

A straw poll was held on 24 September 1950 in Württemberg-Hohenzollern, Württemberg-Baden, and Baden regarding a merger of the three states. A public referendum was held on 16 December 1951. All three states were merged and the modern German state of Baden-Württemberg was founded on 25 April 1952.

Coat of arms
The coat of arms used was the same arms of the Free People's State of Württemberg of the Weimar Republic.

List of Ministers-President

 1945–1947: Carlo Schmid (SPD)
 1947–1948: Lorenz Bock (CDU)
 1948–1952: Gebhard Müller (CDU)

References 

1945 establishments in Germany
1952 disestablishments in West Germany
Former states and territories of Baden-Württemberg